Kim Ha-yun (born 7 January 2000) is a South Korean judoka who competes in the +78 kg category.

Kim attends the Korea National Sport University in Seoul. She is the bronze medallist of the 2019 Judo World Masters in Qingdao and the 2021 Judo Grand Slam Tashkent.

She won one of the bronze medals in her event at the 2022 Judo Grand Slam Paris held in Paris, France.

References

External links
 
 

2000 births
Living people
South Korean female judoka
21st-century South Korean women